The 2012 Bank of Communication Shanghai Masters was a professional ranking snooker tournament that took place between 17 and 23 September 2012 at the Shanghai Grand Stage in Shanghai, China. It was the third ranking event of the 2012/2013 season.

Mark Selby was the defending champion, but he lost in the first round 1–5 against Jamie Cope.

John Higgins won his 25th ranking title by defeating Judd Trump 10–9 in the final. During the final Higgins made the 91st official maximum break. This was Higgins's sixth 147 break and also the third maximum break of the 2012/2013 season.

Prize fund
The breakdown of prize money for this year is shown below:

Winner: £75,000
Runner-up: £30,000
Semi-final: £18,000
Quarter-final: £10,000
Last 16: £7,500
Last 32: £6,000
Last 48: £2,300
Last 64: £1,500

Non-televised highest break: £200
Televised highest break: £2,000
Televised maximum break: £10,000
Total: £410,000

Wildcard round
These matches were played in Shanghai on 17 and 18 September 2012.

Main draw

Final

Qualifying
These matches took place between 24 and 27 July 2012 at the World Snooker Academy in Sheffield, England.

Century breaks

Qualifying stage centuries

 142, 100  David Gilbert
 123  Jamie Cope
 119  Mark Joyce
 117  Alan McManus
 108  Mark King

 105  Michael White
 104  Cao Yupeng
 104  Marcus Campbell
 102  Steve Davis
 100  Gerard Greene

Televised stage centuries

 147, 135, 103  John Higgins
 131, 103  Joe Perry
 131  Matthew Stevens
 130, 103, 102  Ryan Day
 124  Marco Fu
 120  Ali Carter
 114  Mark King

 112, 111, 108, 105, 101  Judd Trump
 112  Lyu Haotian
 112  Ricky Walden
 108  Graeme Dott
 107  Shaun Murphy
 100  Dominic Dale

References

External links

Shanghai Masters 2012 pictures by MoniqueLimbos at Photobucket

2012
Shanghai Masters
Shanghai Masters